Scott Franklin (born 23 August 1980 in Regina, Saskatchewan, Canada), is a Canadian Professional rugby union player who plays rugby for the Prairie Wolf Pack in Canada, and for the Canadian national team. Franklin is a prop/Flanker/#8.

Career 
Before going into professional rugby, Franklin went to the Athol Murray College of Notre Dame in Saskatchewan where he played football, hockey and rugby. He has represented Canada in U-17, U-19 and U-23. He played club rugby with University of Victoria, Campion Grads, Regina Rogues & Castaway Wanderers RFC in British Columbia, before turning pro and moving to CA Brive in France in 2007. Franklin then spent two seasons with the Cornish Pirates from 2008-2010. He has 17 caps for the Canadian national team, the first one against the United States in June 2007. Franklin was part of Canada's squad for the 2007 Rugby World Cup & the 2011 World Cup in New Zealand.

Scott Franklin has recently been selected as part of the "Canada Selects" team that will compete in the 2010 Americas Rugby Championship.

On July 8, 2011 Rugby Canada announced the Canadian 30-man squad for the 2011 Rugby World Cup which included Franklin as one of the five props selected.

References
 Player profile at Rugbycanada.ca
 Profile at scrum.com

1980 births
Living people
Canadian rugby union players
Sportspeople from Regina, Saskatchewan
Canada international rugby union players
Athol Murray College of Notre Dame alumni
Rugby union props